Below is a list of the Yugoslavia men's national basketball team rosters from 1947 to 1991 at the EuroBasket, the FIBA Basketball World Cup and the Summer Olympics:

1940s

1947 EuroBasket 

Yugoslavia finished 13th among 14 teams.

1948 Olympic Games  

Yugoslavia did not participate.

1949 EuroBasket 

Yugoslavia did not participate.

1950s

1950 World Championship 

Yugoslavia finished 10th among 10 teams.

1951 EuroBasket 

Yugoslavia did not participate.

1952 Olympic Games 

Yugoslavia did not participate.

1953 EuroBasket 

Yugoslavia finished 6th among 17 teams

1954 World Championship 

Yugoslavia  finished 11th among 12 teams.

1955 EuroBasket 

Yugoslavia finished 8th among 18 teams.

1956 Olympic Games 

Yugoslavia did not participate.

1957 EuroBasket 

Yugoslavia finished 6th among 16 teams.

1959 EuroBasket 

Yugoslavia finished 9th among 17 teams.

1959 World Championship 

Yugoslavia did not participate.

1960s

1960 Olympic Games 

Yugoslavia finished 6th among 16 teams

1961 EuroBasket 

Yugoslavia finished 2nd among 19 teams.

1963 EuroBasket 

Yugoslavia finished 3rd among 16 teams.

1963 World Championship 

Yugoslavia finished 2nd among 13 teams.

1964 Olympic Games 

Yugoslavia finished 7th among 16 teams

1965 EuroBasket 

Yugoslavia finished 2nd among 16 teams

1967 EuroBasket 

Yugoslavia finished 9th among 16 teams.

1967 World Championship  

Yugoslavia finished 2nd among 13 teams

1968 Olympic Games 

Yugoslavia finished 2nd among 16 teams

1969 EuroBasket 

Yugoslavia finished 2nd among 12 teams.

1970s

1970 World Championship 

Yugoslavia finished 1st among 13 teams.

1971 EuroBasket 

Yugoslavia finished 2nd among 12 teams.

1972 Olympic Games  

Yugoslavia finished 5th among 16 teams.

1973 EuroBasket 

Yugoslavia finished 1st among 12 teams.

1974 World Championship 

Yugoslavia finished 2nd among 14 teams.

1975 EuroBasket  

Yugoslavia finished 1st among 12 teams.

1976 Olympic Games 

Yugoslavia finished 2nd among 12 teams.

1977 EuroBasket 

Yugoslavia finished 1st among 12 teams.

1978 World Championship  

Yugoslavia finished 1st among 14 teams.

1979 EuroBasket 

Yugoslavia finished 3rd among 12 teams.

1980s

1980 Olympic Games 

Yugoslavia finished 1st among 12 teams.

1981 EuroBasket  

Yugoslavia finished 2nd among 12 teams.

1982 World Championship 

Yugoslavia finished 3rd among 13 teams.

1983 EuroBasket 
 
Yugoslavia finished 7th among 12 teams.

1984 Olympic Games 

Yugoslavia finished 3rd among 12 teams.

1985 EuroBasket  

Yugoslavia finished 7th among 12 teams.

1986 World Championship 

Yugoslavia finished 3rd among 24 teams.

1987 EuroBasket 

Yugoslavia finished 3rd among 12 teams.

1988 Olympic Games 

Yugoslavia finished 2nd among 12 teams.

1989 EuroBasket 

Yugoslavia finished 1st among 8 teams.

1990s

1990 World Championship 

Yugoslavia finished 1st among 16 teams.

1991 EuroBasket 

Yugoslavia finished 1st among 8 teams.

References

 
Basketball squads
Basketball